New Picture is an album by saxophonist Jimmy Heath featuring performances recorded in 1985 and released on the Landmark label.

Reception

Scott Yanow at Allmusic noted "Ten years after his most recent set as a leader, Jimmy Heath (heard here on tenor and soprano) finally had another opportunity to lead an album of his own... A tasteful and swinging effort".

Track listing
All compositions by Jimmy Heath except as indicated
 "New Picture"  - 5:00   
 "Lush Life" (Billy Strayhorn) - 8:06   
 "Changes" - 5:59   
 "Keep Love Alive" - 5:21   
 "Dewey Square" (Charlie Parker) - 4:05   
 "Sophisticated Lady" (Duke Ellington, Irving Mills, Mitchell Parish) - 6:44   
 "Togetherness" - 5:10

Personnel
Jimmy Heath - tenor saxophone, soprano saxophone
John Clark, Bobby Routch - French horn (tracks 2, 4 & 6)
Benny Powell - trombone (tracks 2, 4 & 6)
Howard Johnson - tuba (tracks 2, 4 & 6)
 Tony Purrone - guitar
Tommy Flanagan - Rhodes piano (tracks 3 & 4)
Rufus Reid - bass
Al Foster - drums

References

Landmark Records albums
Jimmy Heath albums
1985 albums
Albums produced by Orrin Keepnews
Albums recorded at Van Gelder Studio